Gaëlle Niaré (born 12 March 1982 at Colombes) is a French athlete, who specializes in the high jump.  She is the daughter of Namakoro Niaré and sister of Yves Niaré.

Biography  
In 1999, she placed third in the first World Youth Championships at Bydgoszcz Poland. She also placed fourth in the  2001 Junior European Championships.

She won six titles French National High Jump Championships:  four in outdoor in 2000, 2002, 2003 and 2004 and two indoors in 2000 and 2003.

Prize list  
 French Championships in Athletics   :  
 winner of the high jump in 2000,  2002,  2003 and 2004   
 French Indoors Championships in Athletics:  
 winner of the high jump 2000 and 2003

Records

Notes and references

External links  
  Biography of Gaëlle Niaré on the French Athletics Federation website   
   

1982 births
Living people
Sportspeople from Colombes
French female high jumpers
French people of Malian descent